The Reggio Emilia chess tournament was an annual chess tournament held in Reggio Emilia, Italy. In Italian the tournament is called Torneo di Capodanno (New Year's tournament), as it used to start just after Christmas and end on the day of Epiphany (6 January). It was established as an annual event in 1958 by grandmaster Enrico Paoli.
In 1982/83 the tournament attracted a new sponsor and by the 1990s the tournament had gained significant international reputation, climaxing in the 1991/1992 edition. This was the first Category 18 tournament ever played; it was won by the 22-year-old Viswanathan Anand ahead of Garry Kasparov, Anatoly Karpov and Vassily Ivanchuk.

It was Italy's oldest and most renowned chess tournament. The tournament was usually played as a 10 to 16 player round-robin tournament. The announced 55th edition had to be canceled due to economic reasons.

Winners
{| class="sortable wikitable"
! # !!Year !! Winner
|-
|		||	1947	        ||	
|-
|	-	||	1951	        ||	
|-
|  1	||	1958–59 	||	
|-
|  2	||	1959–60 	||	
|-
|  3	||	1960–61 	||	
|-
|  4	||	1961–62 	||	
|-
|  5	||	1962–63 	||	
|-
|  6	||	1963–64 	||	
|-
|  7	||	1964–65 	||	
|-
|  8	||	1965–66 	||	
|-
|  9	||	1966–67 	||	
|-
|	10	||	1967–68 	||	
|-
|	11	||	1968–69 	||	
|-
|	12	||	1969–70 	||	
|-
|	13	||	1970–71 	||	
|-
|	14	||	1971–72 	||	
|-
|	15	||	1972–73 	||	
|-
|	16	||	1973–74 	||	
|-
|	17	||	1974–75 	||	
|-
|	18	||	1975–76 	||	
|-
|	19	||	1976–77 	||	
|-
|	20	||	1977–78 	||	
|-
|	21	||	1978–79 	||	
|-
|	22	||	1979–80 	||	
|-
|	23	||	1980–81 	||	
|-
|	24	||	1981–82 	||	
|-
|	25	||	1982–83 	||	
|-
|	26	||	1983–84 	||	
|-
|	27	||	1984–85 	||	
|-
|	28	||	1985–86 	||	
|-
|	29	||	1986–87 	||	
|-
|	30	||	1987–88 	||	
|-
|	31	||	1988–89 	||	
|-
|	32	||	1989–90 	||	
|-
|	33	||	1990–91	||	
|-
|	34	||	1991–92 	||	
|-
|	35	||	1992–93 	||	
|-
|	36	||	1993–94 	||	
|-
|	37	||	1994–95 	||	
|-
|	38	||	1995–96 	||	
|-
|	39	||	1996–97 	||	
|-
|	40	||	1997–98 	||	
|-
|	41	||	1998–99 	||	
|-
|	42	||	1999–00 	||	
|-
|	43	||	2000–01	||	
|-
|	44	||	2001–02	||	
|-
|	45	||	2002–03	||	
|-
|	46	||	2003–04	||	
|-
|	47	||	2004–05	||	
|-
|	48	||	2005–06	||	
|-
|	49	||	2006–07	||	
|-
|	50	||	2007–08	||	
|-
|       51      ||      2008–09 ||      
|-
|       52      ||      2009–10 ||      
|-
|       53      ||      2010–11 ||      
|-
|       54      ||      2011–12 ||      
|-
|}

See also
Hastings International Chess Congress

References

External links
 Results, games and crosstables of all editions
 2006 edition from chessbase.com
 The 2007 edition from chessbase.com , 
 Introduction to the 2007 edition
 History of the tournament 1958–1985 
 2010/11 edition

Chess competitions
Chess in Italy
Reggio Emilia
1958 in chess
Recurring events established in 1958